In North America, a Universal Transit Pass (U-Pass)—also known as a Universal Access Transit Pass—is a program that provides students who are enrolled in participating post-secondary institutions with unlimited access to local transit.

Programs are funded through mandatory fees that either eligible students pay for each term in which they are registered or are included in the students' tuition. For example, the University of Washington and the U-Pass program in Chicago have mandatory U-Pass fees. Fees are transferred to the local transit authority to fund the required transit service. Because fees are collected from a large participant base, U-Pass prices are lower than the amount students would otherwise pay for monthly passes or tickets over the course of a term. The U-Pass price charged to students depends on a variety of factors which differ among municipalities, transit systems and post-secondary institutions.

Advantages and disadvantages

Potential benefits
U-Pass programs offer students a way to lower their transportation costs while at school and also benefit the local community and the environment. U-Pass programs can provide the following benefits:

 Save students money — a U-Pass costs less than the amount students would otherwise pay for regular monthly passes or tickets over the course of a term
 Reduce demand for parking on campus (thus less resources spent on constructing parking facilities and more valuable land available for university development) — the more incentive there is for students to take public transportation, the less students there will be who drive to school in their own vehicles.
 Improve the transit system that the university's students and employees rely upon — U-Pass programs often allow for more bus routes and/or better transit service to the institution
 Reduce traffic congestion around the campus and local community — the more people willing to take the bus to university, the less traffic there will be in and around the area
 Contribute to fewer emissions and a reduction to greenhouse gas emissions (consistent with the American College and University President's Climate Commitment)
 Stimulate public transportation ridership, particularly during off-peak, non-commuting hours, thereby filling excess capacity
 Provide a regular and reliable revenue source for transit authorities that may otherwise be low on funding
 Create a sense of brand loyalty and transit travel patterns among students who will be prospective customers in their post-college years
 Reduce the cost burden for local taxpayers to fund public transportation

Potential costs
U-Pass programs that require a 100% adoption rate by universities may subsidize the U-Pass at the expense of students who drive, walk, or bike to school and who do not use transit to get to other locations. Some U-Pass programs offer exemptions for students with mobility restrictions and students who live out of the program range, such as exemptions for students who live in Quebec but commute to school in Ottawa, Ontario.

Other disadvantages include:

 Not able to benefit from the lower cost of U-Pass if students are travelling to school with a different transit system that does not receive U-Pass funding
 Additional load puts more strain on existing resources
 Being charged while taking a term off (e.g. vacation, study abroad, work out of town), courses not offered on campus (e.g. distant learning, graduate thesis, research projects), or being an exchange student

Canada
Thirty academic institutions throughout Canada currently participate in a U-Pass program.

In 1973, Queen's University at Kingston implemented the "Bus-It" program with Kingston Transit, making it the first university in Canada to implement a universal transit pass program. Nearby St. Lawrence College also participates in this program. Students are required to pay for the service as part of student activity fees.

United States
137 academic institutions throughout the United States currently participate in a U-Pass program, including the following.

University of Washington, King County, Washington
One of the first U-Pass programs in the United States was started at the University of Washington (UW) in conjunction with King County Metro (KCM) in the Seattle area. This program began in 1991 and now offers students access to most public transportation services in the Puget Sound region. The program was initially introduced as a short-term pilot program, only the largest transit operator in the Seattle area, KCM and the main UW campus in Seattle were involved. The pilot was so successful that it became permanent; participation is now mandatory for students at all three UW campuses, and six additional transit agencies have joined the program. Students access the bus service by using their university ID card. The UW U-Pass program is paid for mostly through a student and activity fee of $76 per quarter. The fee is highly discounted and includes full fare coverage on a number of metro, commuter, shuttle, vanpool, and car-sharing transit options.

Participation is optional for faculty and staff, who pay $136/quarter for the program. The university, in turn, pays transit operators on a per trip basis according to a negotiated trip rate. The negotiated trip rate varies by operator, but is lower than the cash fare. Studies of UW's U-Pass program demonstrate that since the program began, drive alone commuting has decreased by some 38%. The U-Pass program resulted in a significant increase in demand for transit services and over time as ridership has increased, so has transit service to the campus. The program also generates approximately $7.5 million annually for King County Metro alone.

Chicago, Illinois
The Chicago Transit Authority (CTA) launched its U-PASS program in 1998. Within three years, 22 colleges and universities had joined the program, by entering into a contractual agreement with CTA to provide the U-Pass to all full-time students. The CTA currently contracts with 52 area colleges and universities to offer all students discounted rides for a semester.

All enrolled students are required to purchase the U-Pass. The pass enables the students to make unlimited trips on all CTA buses and trains during the academic year. Students pay for the pass as part of the regular tuition and fees assessed by the participating institutions. The institutions are charged for the U-PASS based on a daily per student charge that was initially set at 50 cents and increased on a regular basis. Since the fall of 2013, the new rate is $1.07 per day, or about $15 per semester. On a monthly basis, students save a minimum of $66 per month over the full-fare price. U-Pass provides more than 35 million rides annually for students.

See also

 U-Pass BC
 Free public transport
 Reduced fare program
 Upass (South Korea)

References

External links
Canada

 BUSU U-Pass
 ACCSA U-Pass
 Transport Canada
 UVic U-Pass
 UBC U-Pass
 SFU U-Pass
 SMU U-Pass
 Calgary Transit U-Pass
 City of Edmonton U-Pass
 Sherbrooke University U-Pass

United States

 Duluth Transit Authority U-Pass
 Chicago Transit Authority U-Pass
 University of Washington U-Pass

Fare collection systems in the United States